The Akatarawa River is a river in the lower North Island of New Zealand.

It is a short river, flowing south for  through small rocky gorges and the Akatarawa Valley before joining the Hutt River at Birchville, a suburb in the northern end of Upper Hutt. Its eventual outflow is into Wellington Harbour, then into Cook Strait.

Rivers of the Wellington Region
Rivers of New Zealand